Jawline is a 2019 documentary film about social media and Internet celebrities. The documentary received several reviews. In February 2019, Hulu acquired United States distribution rights for the film. The film is directed by Liza Mandelup.

Reception
On Rotten Tomatoes, the documentary film holds an approval rating of 97% based on 29 reviews, with an average rating of 7.70/10.

References

External links
 

2019 documentary films
2019 films
Hulu original films
Films about social media
2010s English-language films